Paul Maher may refer to:
Paul Maher Jr. (born 1963), American author, book critic, photographer and filmmaker
Paul Maher (footballer) (born 1976), Australian rules footballer
Paul Maher (Moyne–Templetuohy hurler), Irish hurler
Paul Maher (Kilsheelan–Kilcash hurler), Irish hurler